Loricariichthys cashibo commonly called Carachama (but this name is also used for other species) is a species of catfish in the family Loricariidae. It is endemic to Peru, where it occurs in the upper Amazon River basin. Its type locality is Lake Cashiboya. The species reaches  in length and is believed to be a facultative air-breather.

References 

Loricariini
Fish described in 1942
Fish of Peru
Endemic fauna of Peru
Taxa named by Carl H. Eigenmann